Blaster Master Jr., known as Blaster Master Boy in North America and  in Japan, is an action video game developed by Aicom and published by Sunsoft. The game was released in 1991 for Game Boy.

Gameplay and premise
Players control Jason, the protagonist of Blaster Master, with his car Sophia not present. Players have various abilities, including making Jason fire a gun and plant bombs that can be used to damage enemies and environment. Players will encounter power-ups that will allow Jason to clear obstacles. Players can also upgrade their weapons with other power-ups. Each stage features an exit that requires a key and a boss behind that exit.

Development
It is a sequel to Robowarrior, a spin-off title in the Bomberman series by Hudson Soft. However, the game was marketed in western territories as a game in the Blaster Master series by Sunsoft. Aside from the title change, the game is the same in all regions.

Reception
Hardcore Gaming 101 felt that the game was decent for a Game Boy title, but that they would not replay it due to being unremarkable. They speculated that the name change was due to a similarity between Blaster Masters overhead stages and these.

References

External links 
 

1991 video games
Action video games
Bomberman
Game Boy games
Game Boy-only games
Sunsoft games
Video games developed in Japan
Single-player video games
Aicom games
Blaster Master